Ernest Chaplet (1835 in Sèvres – 1909 in Choisy-le-Roi) was a French designer, sculptor and ceramist. He was a key figure in the French art pottery movement, and his works are held in international public collections such as the Musée d'Orsay, Paris.

Having worked in industry for over 30 years, he opened an atelier with the sculptor Albert-Louis Dammouse in 1882, producing stoneware often influenced by Japanese designs and Chinese prototypes. From 1875 he worked with Félix Bracquemond. Chaplet became head of the Parisian workshops of Charles Haviland of Haviland & Co. in 1882, working in stoneware and porcelain for them.  He worked on ceramics with Paul Gauguin from 1886; together they created some 55 stoneware pots with applied figures or ornamental fragments, multiple handles, painted and partially glazed. He later worked with Jules Dalou and Auguste Rodin.
 
From 1887 Chaplet took up permanent residence at Choisy-le-Roi, often collaborating with the ceramics manufacture Alexandre Bigot. He won acclaim at the 1900 International Exhibition, but lost his sight in 1904, after which his son Emile Lenoble took over his studio. He committed suicide in 1909.

Gallery

References

Sources

Benicka, Corinne. Great Modern Masters. Bookthrift, 1980. 
D'Albis, Jean. Ernest Chaplet. Knowledge Press, 1976
Thiébaud, Philippe. La Revue du Musée d'Orsay, nr  2, February 1996, Paris

19th-century French sculptors
French male sculptors
French ceramists
20th-century French sculptors
20th-century French male artists
1835 births
1909 deaths
People from Sèvres
Art pottery
French potters
1909 suicides
Suicides in France
19th-century French male artists